The following is the performance credits of the American actor Danny Glover.

Film

Television

Video games

Theatre

References

External links
 
 

American filmographies
Male actor filmographies